Dante Antwane Fowler Jr. (born August 3, 1994) is an American football defensive end for the Dallas Cowboys of the National Football League (NFL). He played college football at Florida. Fowler was selected third overall by the Jacksonville Jaguars in the 2015 NFL Draft but missed his entire rookie season after sustaining an ACL tear. He would return the following season and played two more seasons for the Jaguars before being traded to the Los Angeles Rams in 2018. He would later sign with the Atlanta Falcons in 2020.

High school career
Fowler attended Lakewood High School in St. Petersburg, Florida, where he was a two-sport star in football and track. Fowler was named an honorable mention to the Sports Illustrated All-American football team following his senior season, and was selected to the 2012 Under Armour All-America Game. In track, Fowler competed as a shot putter, recording a top throw of 14.32 meters (47 ft).

College career
As a freshman at the University of Florida in 2012, Fowler moved to the outside linebacker position. Fowler played in all 13 games and started his first game against Missouri. He recorded 30 tackles, including eight for loss, and 2.5 sacks. He was named to numerous freshman all-American teams. In 2013, Fowler started all 13 games for the Gators and was named a team captain for the two final games of the season. He recorded 50 tackles, including 10.5 for loss, and 3.5 sacks. In 2014, he slimmed down from 277 to 261 pounds, in an effort to be a more explosive edge player for the Gators. He recorded 60 tackles, including 15 for loss, 8.5 sacks, and two forced fumbles, and was named a first-team All-Southeastern Conference selection by the conference's coaches. In his final game, the 2015 Birmingham Bowl vs East Carolina,  he recorded three sacks helping the Gators to the 28-20 victory.

On November 19, 2014, Fowler tweeted that he would leave the school with Will Muschamp, who announced he would step down as head coach. Fowler made his intentions to forgo his remaining eligibility and enter the 2015 NFL Draft.

Professional career

Jacksonville Jaguars

2015 season
Fowler was selected third overall by the Jacksonville Jaguars in the 2015 NFL Draft. On May 8, 2015, Fowler tore his ACL on the first day of mini-camp and missed the entirety of his rookie season. On May 12, four days after tearing his ACL, Fowler signed a fully guaranteed four-year, $23.5 million contract, with a $15.3 million signing bonus.

2016 season
After missing his entire rookie year due to his ACL injury, Fowler made his NFL debut on September 11, 2016, in the game against the Green Bay Packers, where he made three tackles (one for a loss) as the Jaguars lost the game 27–23.

Fowler ended his first official season playing in all 16 games with one start, recording 32 tackles, 4.0 sacks, and five passes defensed.

2017 season
On September 10, 2017, in the 29–7 season-opening road victory over the Houston Texans, Fowler had a stellar game. He had a 53-yard fumble return for a touchdown near the end of the first half. The touchdown was the first of his NFL career. Late in the third quarter, Fowler forced a fumble off of quarterback Deshaun Watson, which was recovered by teammate Yannick Ngakoue.

The Jaguars finished atop the AFC South with a 10-6 record. In the playoffs, Fowler recorded five tackles, two sacks, and a pass deflection before the Jaguars were defeated 24-20 by the New England Patriots in the AFC Championship Game.

2018 season
On May 2, 2018, the Jaguars declined the fifth-year option on Fowler's contract. On July 20, 2018, he was suspended for one game due to violating the league's personal conduct policy.

In December 2019, the NFLPA revealed that it had won a grievance filed on Fowler's behalf alleging that the Jaguars had improperly fined Fowler over $700,000 for not attending rehab and medical appointments in Jacksonville during the 2018 offseason. Under the collective bargaining agreement, these appointments should have been voluntary. This incident reportedly led to the firing of Jaguars football operations chief Tom Coughlin.

Los Angeles Rams

2018 season

On October 30, 2018, Fowler was traded to the Los Angeles Rams in exchange for a compensatory third-round selection (Quincy Williams) in the 2019 NFL Draft and a fifth-round selection in the 2020 NFL Draft, which ended up being used to select Collin Johnson. Due to a change to the 3-4 defense, Fowler moved to outside linebacker with the Rams. In 8 games of 2018, Fowler finished with 21 tackles, 2 sacks, a pass defended, and a forced fumble. In the playoffs, the Rams defeated the Dallas Cowboys in the Divisional Round and Fowler recorded 2 tackles and a sack. In the NFC Championship Game against the New Orleans Saints, Fowler recorded 5 tackles and 0.5 sacks in a 26-23 overtime victory to advance to Super Bowl LIII and Fowler made a huge play in overtime when he hit Drew Brees to set up an interception by John Johnson III. The Rams played the New England Patriots in the Super Bowl but lost 13-3. Fowler recorded 4 tackles in the loss.

2019 season
On March 11, 2019, Fowler signed a one-year, $14 million contract extension with the Rams.

In the season-opener against the Carolina Panthers, Fowler sacked Cam Newton twice as the Rams won on the road by a score of 30-27. During Week 7 against the Atlanta Falcons, he sacked Matt Ryan thrice in the 37-10 road victory. Three weeks later against the Pittsburgh Steelers, Fowler recovered a fumbled snap by center Maurkice Pouncey and returned it for a 26 yard touchdown in the 17–12 road loss. During Week 16 against the San Francisco 49ers, he sacked Jimmy Garoppolo 2.5 times during a 34–31 road loss.

Atlanta Falcons
On March 25, 2020, Fowler signed a three-year, $48 million contract with the Atlanta Falcons. He was placed on the reserve/COVID-19 list by the team on November 14, 2020, and activated on November 25.

On October 22, 2021, Fowler was placed on injured reserve with a knee injury. On November 14, 2021, Fowler was activated from IR in time to be active for week 10 game versus Dallas Cowboys. He was released on February 16, 2022.

Dallas Cowboys
On March 18, 2022, Fowler signed a one-year contract with the Dallas Cowboys.

NFL career statistics

Regular season

Postseason

Personal life
On July 18, 2017, Fowler was arrested in St. Petersburg, Florida for simple battery and committing mischief. Fowler confronted a man who commented about his driving, struck the man, broke his glasses, and threw a bag containing liquor into a lake. He was released from jail the next day on a $650 bond. On March 1, 2018, Fowler pleaded no contest to battery, criminal mischief, and petty theft. He was fined $2,575, received a year of probation, and was ordered to undergo 75 hours of community service.

His younger brother, Donterio Rashad Fowler, was arrested in July 2021 in connection to the 2016 murder of a Florida International University student.

References

External links
Los Angeles Rams bio
Jacksonville Jaguars bio
Florida Gators bio

1994 births
Living people
Players of American football from St. Petersburg, Florida
Under Armour All-American football players
American football defensive ends
American football outside linebackers
Florida Gators football players
Jacksonville Jaguars players
Los Angeles Rams players
Atlanta Falcons players
Dallas Cowboys players